Thomas Sheridan may refer to:

Thomas Sheridan (divine) (1687–1738), Anglican divine
Thomas Sheridan (actor) (1719–1788), Irish actor and teacher of elocution
Thomas Sheridan (soldier) (1775–1817/18)
Thomas B. Sheridan (born 1931), American engineer
Thomas Sheridan (politician) (1640s–1712), Chief Secretary for Ireland
Tommy Sheridan (born 1964), Scottish socialist politician
Sir Thomas Sheridan (Jacobite), advisor in the Jacobite rising of 1745
Tom Sheridan (handballer), Gaelic handball player
Tom Sheridan (footballer) (born 1993), Australian rules footballer
Thomas I. Sheridan ( – ), American lawyer and politician from New York
 Thomas Sheridan (anthropologist) (born 1951), anthropologist of Sonora, Mexico